Peter Eugen Arthur Baron von Buxhoeveden (28 March 1882 Muratsi manor, Saare County – 27 September 1964 Karlsruhe) was a Baltic-German military colonel who served in the forces of the Imperial Russian Army and Estonia.

He graduated from Kuressaare Gymnasium and Tver Cavalry School.

He participated on World War I, being an officer for Czarist Russia.

1918 he entered into Saaremaa Defence Forces. He participated on Estonian War of Independence, fighting for Estonia. From 1920 until 1928, he was the commander of Cavalry NCOs' School. In 1928 he retired. In 1939, he moved to Germany and died in Karlsruhe in 1964. On 12 September 2014, the ashes of von Buxhoevden and his wife Kira (née Scheidemann) were buried in the Defence Forces Cemetery of Tallinn.

von Buxhoevden was one of the leading persons to advance the integration of Baltic Germans into Estonian society.

Awards
 1920: Cross of Liberty, I class II rank.
 1925: Order of Lāčplēsis, III class

References

1882 births
1964 deaths
Estonian military personnel
Estonian military personnel of the Estonian War of Independence
Baltic-German people from the Russian Empire
Estonian people of Baltic German descent
People from Saaremaa Parish